Johanna Fernández (Miss Costa Rica) (born 1982) was the Costa Rican contestant at the Miss Universe 2005 pageant.  At the time she was a student at San Judas University. 

As of 2023, she works in human resources.

References

1982 births
Costa Rican beauty pageant winners
Costa Rican female models
Living people
Miss Universe 2005 contestants
Place of birth missing (living people)
Date of birth missing (living people)

External links
 public Instagram account